Rayne is a surname. Notable people with the surname include:

Cuthbert Rayne, hunter at the court of James VI of Scotland
Dana Rayne, singer
Madison Rayne (born 1986), ring name of American professional wrestler Ashley Cabot (née Simmons)
Max Rayne, Baron Rayne, British philanthropist

Fictional characters:
Ethan Rayne, character on Buffy the Vampire Slayer

See also
Raynes, a surname